Parnówko  is a settlement in the administrative district of Gmina Biesiekierz, within Koszalin County, West Pomeranian Voivodeship, in north-western Poland. The town had a population of 54 as of 2005.

See also
History of Pomerania.

References

Villages in Koszalin County